In quantum mechanics, the case of a particle in a one-dimensional ring is similar to the particle in a box. The Schrödinger equation for a free particle which is restricted to a ring (technically, whose configuration space is the circle ) is

Wave function 

Using polar coordinates on the 1-dimensional ring of radius R, the wave function depends only on the angular coordinate, and so

,

and

Under these conditions, the solution to the Schrödinger equation is given by

Energy eigenvalues 

The energy eigenvalues  are quantized because of the periodic boundary conditions, and they are required to satisfy

, or

The eigenfunction and eigenenergies are

 where 

Therefore, there are 2n+1 states with energies up to an energy indexed by the number n.

The case of a particle in a one-dimensional ring is an instructive example when studying the quantization of angular momentum for, say, an electron orbiting the nucleus. The azimuthal wave functions in that case are identical to the energy eigenfunctions of the particle on a ring.

The statement that any wavefunction for the particle on a ring can be written as a superposition of energy eigenfunctions is exactly identical to the Fourier theorem about the development of any periodic function in a Fourier series.

This simple model can be used to find approximate energy levels of some ring molecules, such as benzene.

Application 

In organic chemistry, aromatic compounds contain atomic rings, such as benzene rings (the Kekulé structure) consisting  of five or six, usually carbon, atoms. So does the surface of "buckyballs" (buckminsterfullerene). This ring behaves like a circular waveguide, with the valence electrons orbiting in both directions. To fill all energy levels up to n requires  electrons, as electrons have additionally two possible orientations of their spins. This gives exceptional stability ("aromatic"), and is known as the Hückel's rule.

Further in rotational spectroscopy this model may be used as an approximation of rotational energy levels.

References

See also 

 Angular momentum
 Harmonic analysis
 One-dimensional periodic case
 Semicircular potential well
 Spherical potential well

Quantum models